"Throw Your Arms Around Me" is a song by Australian rock band Hunters & Collectors first released as a single in November 1984 by White Label for Mushroom Records. A re-recorded version of the song later appeared on the band's 1986 album Human Frailty. Written by bass guitarist John Archer, keyboardist Geoffrey Crosby, drummer Douglas Falconer, trumpet player Jack Howard, recorder/mixing engineer Robert Miles, vocalist/lead guitarist Mark Seymour and trombone player Michael Waters. The song captures the intensity of sensual love at the same time portraying its fleeting nature with lyrics including "And we may never meet again, So shed your skin and let's get started".

In January 2018, as part of Triple M's "Ozzest 100", the 'most Australian' songs of all time, "Throw Your Arms Around Me" was ranked number 19.

Background
Hunters & Collectors had formed in 1981 with  Mark Seymour (guitar, vocals), John Archer (bass guitar), Doug Falconer (drums) Geoff Crosby (keyboards), Greg Perano (percussion), Ray Tosti-Guerra (guitar), and Robert Miles, their sound engineer and art director. Miles was credited as an equal part of the band's output and stayed with the band throughout their career. Tosti-Guerra was later replaced by Martin Lubran, then by Barry Palmer. Seymour is the older brother of bassist Nick Seymour of Crowded House. Hunters & Collectors signed to White Label, an offshoot of Mushroom Records, and by 1985 the line-up was Seymour, Archer, Falconer, Crosby and Miles with Jack Howard on trumpet and Michael Waters on trombone. They recorded the first version of "Throw Your Arms Around Me" for a single-only release in 1984, with "Unbeliever" as its B-side; all members were credited as the songs' writers. A live version of "Throw Your Arms Around Me" appeared on their 1985 album The Way to Go Out. Their breakthrough commercial success in Australia came in 1986, with the release of the album Human Frailty, which featured another recording of the single "Throw Your Arms Around Me", as well as "Say Goodbye" and "Everything's on Fire". In 1990, a slower, more acoustically introspective version of the single was recorded and released from their compilation album Collected Works. The promotional video was a mosaic of all their previous videos. 

Mark Seymour described writing for Human Frailty:

Cover versions
A shortened version was performed by Crowded House (a band whose members include Mark Seymour's brother Nick) at their Farewell to the World concert in 1996 and earlier was covered by the band on MTV Unplugged. 

The song has been covered by Australian musical comedy act Tripod, famous for their work on the Triple J radio Australian network. The song was covered by Pearl Jam, with the lyric "I will kiss you in four places" changed to "I will kiss you in 155 places" by vocalist Eddie Vedder. Neil Finn attributes this change to Vedder's having heard one of Crowded House's many cover versions of the song before hearing the original. Finn typically changes the number each time he performs it. 

The comic trio Doug Anthony All Stars performed acoustic versions of this song at many of their performances. In 2007, Kate Ceberano recorded a version for her album Nine Lime Avenue. 

Australian singer-songwriter Hopkinson released a version to radio in 2009 and Canadian musician Allison Crowe recorded the song for release on her 2010 album Spiral. 

The song frequently was performed in concert by Canadian band Spirit of the West, although they never released a studio cover.

In 2004, Original Yellow Wiggle, Greg Page recorded a version of the song on his album of the same name. In 2013, a cover version Vedder and Finn as a duo appeared on the tribute album Crucible – The Songs of Hunters & Collectors.

A Spanish version of the song titled "Deja Caer Tus Brazos Sobre Mi" was released in 2019 by Melbourne based musician Damián Gaume in collaboration with bassist John Favaro (Mark Seymour and the Undertow), singer Piru Sáez, drummer Julián Isod (Ciro Y Los Persas) and Jack Gaume.

Phil "Swill" Odgers of the English band The Men They Couldn't Hang recorded and performed an acoustic version of the song during the first of his Facebook live "Sunday Sessions" on 26 April 2020 during the Covid-19 lockdown. He included it on the CD The Best of Swill's Sunday Session 2020, Volume 1. During the spoken introduction he states "Mark Seymour even messaged me to say that it was ok to do this song - honestly - a couple of years ago."

Legacy
"Throw Your Arms Around Me" remained one of the more popular songs in Australia for years, being voted number 2, 2 and 4 on the Triple J Hottest 100 in 1989, 1990 and 1991. Prior to 1992, songs from any year were eligible for inclusion in the hottest 100. It placed 2nd in Triple J's Hottest 100 of All Time in 1998. In May 2001 the Australasian Performing Right Association (APRA), as part of its 75th Anniversary celebrations, named "Throw Your Arms Around Me" as one of the Top 30 Australian songs of all time.

Junkee noted, "Nobody that has witnessed this song being sung drunkenly in a pub by a hundred people, arms linked, can deny its hold over the Australian psyche."

Track listing
All tracks written by John Archer, Geoffrey Crosby, Douglas Falconer, Jack Howard, Robert Miles, Mark Seymour and Michael Waters, according to APRA.
 "Throw Your Arms Around Me" - 3:29
 "Unbeliever" - 5:19

Charts

Personnel
Credited to:
Hunters & Collectors members
 John Archer — bass guitar
 Geoffrey Crosby — keyboards
 Douglas Falconer — drums
 John 'Jack' Howard — trumpet
 Mark Seymour — vocals, lead guitar
 Michael Waters — trombone

Recording details
Producer — Hunters & Collectors
Gavin MacKillop, Hunters & Collectors (1986 version)
Recording/mixing engineer — Robert Miles
Studio — John & Paula's Hardware St. Studio, Planetbrain Enterprises; 
 Allan Easton's Studio, St Kilda (1986 version)

Art works
Art director — Robert Miles
Photography — Lauritzphoto (1986 front cover)

References

External links
Human Frailty fan website on "Throw Your Arms Around Me"

1985 singles
1986 singles
1990 singles
APRA Award winners
Hunters & Collectors songs
1984 songs
Mushroom Records singles
Songs written by Mark Seymour